Anna Chiara Mascolo (born 5 June 2001) is an Italian swimmer. She competed in the women's 4 × 200 metre freestyle relay at the 2020 Summer Olympics.

References

External links
 

2001 births
Living people
Italian female freestyle swimmers
Olympic swimmers of Italy
Swimmers at the 2020 Summer Olympics
Sportspeople from Florence